Lawrence J. Korb (born July 9, 1939, in New York City) is a senior fellow at the Center for American Progress and a senior adviser to the Center for Defense Information. He was formerly director of national security studies at the Council on Foreign Relations in New York.

Education and Naval service
Korb attended the Athenaeum of Ohio, where he earned his bachelor of arts degree in 1961. Going on to St. John's University, he obtained his master's degree in 1962, before joining the U.S. Navy in 1962. Korb served on active duty for four years as a naval flight officer and was a crew member on a P-3 Orion surveillance plane in Vietnam. He later transferred to the Naval Reserve, and retired with the rank of Captain. On completing his active duty, Korb returned to graduate school, where he received his Ph.D. at the State University of New York Albany in 1969. Korb served as Associate Professor of Government at the U.S. Coast Guard Academy from 1971 to 1975 and later Professor of Management at the Naval War College in 1975–1980.

Government career
Korb served as adviser to the Reagan–Bush election committee in 1980 and was then appointed Assistant Secretary of Defense (Manpower, Reserve Affairs, Installations and Logistics) from 1981 to 1985. In that position, he administered about 70 percent of the defense budget. For his service he was awarded the Department of Defense's medal for Distinguished Public Service.

Career in academic administration, on boards, and in advisory work
Korb was a Senior Fellow and Director of National Security Studies at the Council on Foreign Relations. From July 1998 to October 2002, he was Council Vice President, Director of Studies, and holder of the Maurice Greenberg Chair. Prior to joining the Council, Korb served as Director of the Center for Public Policy Education and Senior Fellow in the Foreign Policy Studies Program at the Brookings Institution, dean of the Graduate School of Public and International Affairs at the University of Pittsburgh, and Vice President of Corporate Operations at the Raytheon Company.

In 2005 Korb, Robert O. Boorstin, and the National Security Staff of the Center for American Progress published a position paper called "Integrated Power: A National Security Strategy for the 21st Century." In it they criticized President George W. Bush for invading Iraq and for devoting inadequate resources to the fight against Islamic fundamentalism. The authors also detailed plans to increase the manpower of the United States Army, to prevent terrorists from acquiring weapons of mass destruction, to spread liberal democratic values throughout the Middle East, and to reduce American dependence on foreign oil.

Korb is also a member of the Honorary Board of the Servicemembers Legal Defense Network, an organization dedicated to ending discrimination against gay and lesbian people serving in the U.S. military, and to repealing the Don't ask, don't tell policy. Korb also served on the military adviser committee for Business Leaders for Sensible Priorities, whose aim was to redirect 15 percent of the military's budget to social programs like education, healthcare, job training, humanitarian relief, renewable energies, and reducing the deficit. In 2008 Korb worked as an advisor to the Hillary Clinton's presidential campaign.

Published works
Korb's 20 books on national security issues include
 The Joint Chiefs of Staff: The First Twenty-five Years (1976)
 The System for Educating Military Officers in the U.S. (1976)
 The Fall and Rise of the Pentagon (1979)
 American National Security: Policy and Process (1989)
 Future Visions for U.S. Defense Policy
 Reshaping America's Military
 A New National Security Strategy in an Age of Terrorists, Tyrants, and Weapons of Mass Destruction.

Lawrence Korb's more than 100 articles have appeared in such journals as Foreign Affairs, Public Administration Review, the New York Times Sunday Magazine, Naval Institute Proceedings, and International Security.

His more than 100 op-ed pieces have appeared in such major newspapers as the Washington Post, New York Times, Wall Street Journal, Washington Times, Los Angeles Times, Boston Globe, Baltimore Sun, Philadelphia Inquirer, and Christian Science Monitor.

Television commentator
Over the past decade, Korb has made over a thousand appearances as a commentator on such shows as Countdown with Keith Olbermann, The Today Show, The Early Show, Good Morning America, Face the Nation, This Week With David Brinkley, the MacNeil–Lehrer News Hour, News Hour with Jim Lehrer, Nightline, 60 Minutes, Frontline, Larry King Live, the O'Reilly Factor, Crossfire and Al-Jazeera's News Hour.

Notes

External links
 Center for American Progress bio
 Integrated Power: A National Security Strategy for the 21st Century
 

United States Assistant Secretaries of Defense
1939 births
Living people
The Athenaeum of Ohio alumni
St. John's University (New York City) alumni
United States Navy officers
Naval War College faculty
University at Albany, SUNY alumni
Politicians from New York City
Reagan administration personnel
Center for American Progress people